The 1981–82 FIBA Korać Cup was the 11th edition of FIBA's Korać Cup basketball competition. The French Limoges CSP defeated the Yugoslav Šibenka in the final on March 18, 1982 in Padua, Italy.

First round

|}

Second round

|}

Automatically qualified to round of 16
  Joventut Sony (title holder)
  Carrera Venezia
  Crvena zvezda
  Spartak Leningrad
  Cagiva Varese

Round of 16

Semi finals

|}

Final
March 18, Palasport San Lazzaro, Padua

|}
Limoges: Yves-Marie Verove, Jean-Michel Senegal 12, Richard Billet, Richard Dacoury 10, Ed Murphy 35, Irv Kiffin 21, Apollo Faye 2, Didier Rose, Tremulles, Jean-Luc Deganis 10.
Šibenka: Dražen Petrović 19, Fabjan Žurić, Živko Ljubojević 16, Sreten Đurić, Damir Damjanić, Branko Macura 23, Željko Marelja 6, Robert Jablan, Srećko Jarić 16, Nenad Slavica 2.

External links
 1981–82 FIBA Korać Cup @ linguasport.com
1981–82 FIBA Korać Cup
 Report from final match in Slobodna Dalmacija archive

1980–81
1981–82 in European basketball